Uropterygius macrocephalus is a moray eel found in coral reefs in the Pacific and Indian Oceans. It is commonly known as the needle-tooth moray, large-headed snake moray, largehead snake moray, largehead moray, longhead moray, or the snowflake eel. It is used sometimes in aquariums.

References

macrocephalus
Fish described in 1864